Saling Branch (also called Sailing Branch) is a stream in the U.S. state of Missouri.

Saling Branch was named after the local Sailing family.

See also
List of rivers of Missouri

References

Rivers of Knox County, Missouri
Rivers of Macon County, Missouri
Rivers of Shelby County, Missouri
Rivers of Missouri